Simon Cimon (December 15, 1852 – March 22, 1903) was a Quebec civil engineer and political figure. He represented Charlevoix in the House of Commons of Canada as a Conservative member from 1887 to 1891.

He was born at La Malbaie, Canada East in 1852, the son of Simon-Xavier Cimon, and studied at the Collège de Montmagny and Thom's Academy in Quebec. He was also a Provincial Land Surveyor for the province of Quebec. He served as an engineer for the Grenville Canal and then was engineer for the Quebec, Montreal, Ottawa and Occidental Railway. From 1879 to 1887, Cimon was employed by the Canadian Department of Public Works. In 1884, he married Marie-Julie-Charlotte-Amanda, the daughter of Paschal-Vinceslas Taché, sheriff for Kamouraska. He was elected to represent Charlevoix in the House of Commons following the death of his father in 1887.

He died at Saint-Étienne-de-la-Malbaie in 1903.

References
 
The Canadian parliamentary companion, 1889, JA Gemmill
La famille Taché, P-G Roy (1904)

1852 births
1903 deaths
Conservative Party of Canada (1867–1942) MPs
Members of the House of Commons of Canada from Quebec